The Vasconic languages (from Latin  'Basque') are a putative family of languages that includes Basque and the extinct Aquitanian language. The extinct Iberian language is sometimes putatively included.

The concept of the Vasconic languages is often linked to the Vasconic substratum hypothesis of Theo Vennemann, who speculated that the ancestors of the Basque spread across Europe at the end of the last glacial period when the Cro-Magnons entered Europe and left traces in the modern languages of Europe. Along with other hypotheses that seek to relate Basque to other languages of the world, this is widely rejected by historical linguists.

Proponents of a Vasconic language family argue that Basque and the extinct Aquitanian language are close relatives, or that the modern varieties of Basque are distinct languages rather than dialects. However, these notions contradict conventional views on these languages, in two areas:
Theories regarding the relationship between Aquitanian and Basque, which suggest that either:
 Aquitanian is the ancestor of Basque, and as Larry Trask puts it: "Aquitanian is so closely related to Basque that we can, for practical purposes, regard it as being the more-or-less direct ancestor of Basque",
 or that a hypothetical Proto-Basque is the parent language of Aquitanian,
The view that varieties of Basque are dialects with varying degrees of mutual intelligibility. This view is held by scholars such as Trask, Koldo Zuazo, and Koldo Mitxelena. Trask states: "Nonetheless, the diversification should not be exaggerated, as has often been done in the literature: the dialects are overwhelmingly congruent in their fundamentals and differ chiefly in vocabulary and in a few low-level phonological rules."

Various attempts have been made to tie other languages, modern or extinct, such as Iberian, the language of the Nuraghe, and the language of the Cantabri and various others to Vasconic. None of these theories have been able to provide convincing data, and they are rejected by most mainstream Basque linguists.

A reconstruction of a Proto-Vasconic language is almost impossible with currently available information. More data and research are needed to reconstruct the basics of a proto-language, as well as more information surrounding the neighboring extinct languages such as Iberian and the relationship it has with Vasconic. Reconstruction of a hypothesized Vasconic Proto-language could only be done using the comparative method, although the accuracy of the reconstructed proto-language would still be uncertain.

See also
 Paleohispanic languages
 Paleohispanic scripts
 Prehistoric Iberia
 Pre-Roman peoples of the Iberian Peninsula
 Proto-language
 Vasconic substrate hypothesis

References

Pre-Indo-Europeans
Basque language
Proposed language families